Group C of the men's football tournament at the 2016 Summer Olympics was played from 4 to 10 August 2016, and included Fiji, Germany, Mexico and South Korea. The top two teams advanced to the knockout stage.

All times are BRT (UTC−3).

Teams

Standings

Matches

Mexico vs Germany

Fiji vs South Korea

Fiji vs Mexico

Germany vs South Korea

Germany vs Fiji

South Korea vs Mexico

References

External links
Football – Men, Rio2016.com
Men's Olympic Football Tournament, Rio 2016, FIFA.com

Group C